Mahmut Boz (born 16 April 1991) is a Turkish footballer who plays as a defender for Bayburt Özel İdarespor.

References
Osmanlıspor'da garip transfer, yurtspor.com, 15 January 2016

External links
 
 
 Guardian Stats Centre
 

1991 births
Sportspeople from Eskişehir
Living people
Turkish footballers
Turkey youth international footballers
Turkey under-21 international footballers
Turkey B international footballers
Association football defenders
Gençlerbirliği S.K. footballers
Sivasspor footballers
Karşıyaka S.K. footballers
Boluspor footballers
Eskişehirspor footballers
Gaziantep F.K. footballers
Bayrampaşaspor footballers
Orduspor footballers
Ankaraspor footballers
Turgutluspor footballers
Süper Lig players
TFF First League players
TFF Second League players